Union Township is one of the ten townships of Fayette County, Ohio, United States. At the 2010 census the population was 3,733.

Geography
Located at the center of the county, it borders the following townships:
Paint Township - north
Marion Township - northeast
Wayne Township - southeast
Perry Township - south
Concord Township - southwest
Jasper Township - west
Jefferson Township - northwest

Union Township is the only township in the county that does not border another county.

Central Union Township is occupied by the county seat of Washington Court House, the only city in Fayette County. A small corner of the village of Bloomingburg also sits in the northeastern part of the township.

Name and history
It is one of twenty-seven Union Townships statewide.

Union Township's first white child was Ephraim Henkle, who was born on April 23, 1818.

In 1833, Union Township contained two gristmills and two saw mills, a fulling mill, and a carding machine.

Government
The township is governed by a three-member board of trustees, who are elected in November of odd-numbered years to a four-year term beginning on the following January 1. Two are elected in the year after the presidential election and one is elected in the year before it. There is also an elected township fiscal officer, who serves a four-year term beginning on April 1 of the year after the election, which is held in November of the year before the presidential election. Vacancies in the fiscal officership or on the board of trustees are filled by the remaining trustees.

References

External links
County website

Townships in Fayette County, Ohio
Townships in Ohio